Christopher Ameyaw-Akumfi (born 21 January  1945 in Techiman, Bono East Region) is a Ghanaian academic and politician.  Ameyaw-Akumfi was the Minister of Education in the John Agyekum Kufour administration.

Early life and politics 
Christopher Ameyaw-Akumfi was born on 21 January 1945 at his hometown Jama-Techiman in his constituency. He began his political career after being elected into parliament in 2008 obtaining over 53.4% of the total votes.

Education
Ameyaw-Akumfi attended Adisadel College in Cape Coast for his GCE O' and A' Levels. He entered the University of Ghana in 1965 and graduated with a Bachelor of Science in Zoology in 1969 and earned his master's degree in the same field a year later. In 1970, he left to study Zoology at the University of Michigan in the United States, where he earned his doctorate in 1972.

Professional career 
Ameyaw-Akumfi has participated in both University of Cape Coast and University of Ghana system for many years and has been especially instrumental in the reform and decentralization of the university system in the country.

References

Sources
 

1945 births
Living people
People from Bono East Region
New Patriotic Party politicians
Education ministers of Ghana
Government ministers of Ghana
Ghanaian MPs 2009–2013
University of Michigan alumni
Academic staff of the University of Cape Coast
Academic staff of the University of Ghana